François Châtelet (born 27 February 1939) is a French middle-distance runner. He competed in the men's 800 metres at the 1964 Summer Olympics.

References

1939 births
Living people
Athletes (track and field) at the 1964 Summer Olympics
French male middle-distance runners
Olympic athletes of France
Place of birth missing (living people)
Mediterranean Games silver medalists for France
Mediterranean Games medalists in athletics
Athletes (track and field) at the 1963 Mediterranean Games
20th-century French people
21st-century French people